Ofeq-9, also known as Ofek 9 ("Horizon in Hebrew), is part of the Ofeq family of reconnaissance satellites designed and built by Israel Aerospace Industries (IAI) for the Israeli Ministry of Defense.

Launch 
It was launched on 22 June 2010, at 19:00 UTC, from Palmachim Air Baise in Israel. It was delivered using an improved version of the Shavit launcher.

Mission 
The payload is believed to be the multi-spectral "Jupiter" space camera produced by El-Op. While precise imaging capabilities remain classified, sources say that like the still operating Ofeq-5 and Ofeq-7, Ofeq-9 offers a resolution "much better than" a half-meter. The satellite was also said to be able to detect objects being carried by people. The satellite operates in a retrograde low Earth orbit.

References 

Reconnaissance satellites of Israel
Spacecraft launched by Shavit rockets
Spacecraft launched in 2010
2010 in Israel
IAI satellites